Scotorythra caryopis is a moth of the family Geometridae. It was first described by Edward Meyrick in 1899. It is endemic to the Hawaiian islands of Kauai and Oahu.

The larvae feed on Acacia koa.

External links

Moths described in 1899
C
Endemic moths of Hawaii
Biota of Kauai
Biota of Oahu